Tad Willoughby (born September 8, 1960) is a retired American soccer midfielder who played four seasons in the Western Soccer Alliance and three in the Major Indoor Soccer League.

Playing
Willoughby grew up in Bellevue, Washington.  He attended the University of Washington where he played soccer from 1979 to 1983.  In 1984, he joined F.C. Seattle for the F.C. Seattle Challenge Series which pitted the team against three North American Soccer League teams.  He did not play for Seattle in 1985, but rejoined the team in 1986 and played through the 1989 season.  In 1986, Seattle coach Jimmy Gabriel installed Willoughby as the teams primary playmaker.  He retired from playing following the 1989 season.  Willoughby served as the teams ticket manager until released in February 1990.  Willoughby had also spent three seasons for the Tacoma Stars in the Major Indoor Soccer League.

References

External links
 1989 Seattle Storm roster
 MISL stats

Living people
American soccer players
Soccer players from Oregon
Major Indoor Soccer League (1978–1992) players
Seattle Storm (soccer) players
Tacoma Stars players
Washington Huskies men's soccer players
Western Soccer Alliance players
1960 births
Association football midfielders